Novi Sad Synagogue ( or ) is  one of many cultural institutions in Novi Sad, Serbia, in the capital of Serbian the province of Vojvodina. Located on Jevrejska (Jewish) Street, in the city center, the synagogue has been recognized as a historic landmark. It served the local Neolog congregation.

The new synagogue, the fifth to be erected at the same location since the 18th century, became a major project for the entire Jewish community of Novi Sad, on which construction began in 1905 and was completed in 1909. Projected by Hungarian architect Baumhorn Lipót, it was part of a bigger complex of buildings that included on both sides of the synagogue two edifices decorated in a similar pattern: One building served as the Jewish school and other as offices of the Jewish community.

More than 4,000 Jews lived in Novi Sad before the Second World War, out of a total population of 80,000. Only about 1,000 of them survived the Holocaust that followed the German invasion of Yugoslavia in 1941 and the annexation of Bačka region by Hungary. Many moved to Israel after the war. There are an estimated 400 Jews living in Novi Sad today. Currently, while the synagogue is not used for religious ceremonies, it is used for many cultural concerts and events.

In 1991 Novi Sad Synagogue was added to Spatial Cultural-Historical Units of Great Importance list, and it is protected by Republic of Serbia.

See also
Jews in Serbia
Spatial Cultural-Historical Units of Great Importance
Religious architecture in Novi Sad
Belgrade Synagogue
Tourism in Serbia
Subotica Synagogue

External links 
The Synagogue of Novi Sad, Serbia - The Museum of the Jewish People at Beit Hatfutsot

References

Art Nouveau synagogues
Synagogues completed in 1909
Synagogues in Serbia
Neolog Judaism synagogues
Religious buildings and structures in Vojvodina
Synagogue
Art Nouveau architecture in Serbia
Spatial Cultural-Historical Units of Great Importance
Synagogue